Karim Chaibai (born 5 October 1982), is a Belgian futsal player who plays for FT Charleroi and the Belgian national futsal team.

References

External links
 
 UEFA profile
 Futsalteam profile

1982 births
Living people
Belgian men's futsal players